Missing You (Korean: 널 기다리며) is a 2016 South Korean revenge thriller film written and directed by Mo Hong-jin. It was released in South Korea on March 10, 2016.

Plot
When Hee-Joo (Shim Eun-Kyung) was 7-years-old her father was murdered. Her father worked as a detective and was working on a serial killer case. The killer, Ki-Bum (Kim Sung-Oh), was eventually arrested, but found guilty for only one murder. 15 years later, Ki-Bum is released from prison. Detective Dae-Young (Yoon Je-Moon) worked on the original case with Hee-Joo's father and he has not given up getting a murder conviction for his former partner. Meanwhile, Hee-Joo has waited patiently for Gi-beom's release.

Cast 
Shim Eun-kyung as Hee-joo
Yoon Je-moon as Dae-yeong 
Kim Sung-oh as Gi-beom

Reception

Awards and nominations

References

External links

2010s thriller films
South Korean thriller films
South Korean films about revenge
2010s South Korean films